In 2012, Colleen Zenk opened the ceremony at New World Stages with a live musical performance, while Fan Yang's Gazillion Bubble Show closed the show.

Awards 
Nominations were announced on December 19, 2011, with Pretty receiving a record 13 nominations. Winners are listed first and highlighted in boldface:

References

External links
 Indie Series Awards History and Archive of Past Winners

Indie Series Awards
2012 film awards